Heliotropium indicum, commonly known as Indian heliotrope, Indian turnsole is an annual, hirsute plant that is a common weed in waste places and settled areas. It is native to Asia. It is widely used in native medicine in Tamil Nadu, India.

It grows wildly on roadsides and has a curved arrangement of small flowers and velvety broad green leaves

Description

It has a hairy stem, bearing alternating ovate to oblong-ovate leaves. It has small white or purple flowers with a green calyx; five stamens borne on a corolla tube; a terminal style; and a four-lobed ovary.

Distribution

The plant is native to Asia.  A common weed in waste places and settled areas.

Traditional medicine
In the Philippines, the plant is chiefly used as a traditional medicine.  The extracted juice from the pounded leaves of the plants is used on wounds, skin ulcers and furuncles.  The juice is also used as an eye drop for conjunctivitis.  The pounded leaves are used as poultice.

Toxicity
Heliotropium indicum contains tumorigenic pyrrolizidine alkaloids.

References

External links

indicum
Plants described in 1753
Taxa named by Carl Linnaeus